The Dr. Abner Benton House is a historic house located in Oxbow, Jefferson County, New York.

Description and history 
It was built in 1819, and is a two-story, three-bay wide, brick Federal-style residence. The interior features a side hallway plan, two rooms deep.

It was listed on the National Register of Historic Places on August 23, 1984.

References

Houses on the National Register of Historic Places in New York (state)
Federal architecture in New York (state)
Houses completed in 1819
Houses in Jefferson County, New York
National Register of Historic Places in Jefferson County, New York